Better Times is an extended play (EP) by American country band Asleep at the Wheel. Recorded at Bismeaux on the Hill and Moonhouse Studios, it was produced by the group's frontman Ray Benson with Sam "Lightnin'" Seifert, and was released on May 28, 2021 by Benson's own label Bismeaux Productions. Better Times is the group's first release to feature steel guitarist Flavio Pasquetto, who replaced Eddie Rivers in 2019.

Background
According to Asleep at the Wheel frontman Ray Benson, the title track of Better Times was written "after nearly a year of this pandemic", referring to the COVID-19 pandemic, which he likens to "a war with an invisible enemy". Benson performs lead vocals on the track; fiddler Katie Shore performs lead vocals on "All I'm Asking"; and the pair duet on "Columbus Stockdale Blues". The band performed "Better Times" at Benson's "birthday bash" during the 2021 South by Southwest festival in Austin, Texas.

Track listing

Personnel

Asleep at the Wheel
Ray Benson – guitar, vocals, production
Katie Shore – fiddle, vocals
Flavio Pasquetto – steel guitar
Dennis Ludiker – fiddle, mandolin, backing vocals
Josh Hoag – bass
John Michael Whitby – piano
David Sanger – drums

Guest performers
Ginny Mac – piano, accordion
Floyd Domino – piano
Jason Baczynski – drums
Joey Colarusso – saxophone
Chloe Feoranzo – clarinet

Additional personnel
Sam Seifert – production, engineering, mixing, guitar
Curtis Clogston – engineering
Chris Gage – additional engineering, piano
Eric Conn – mastering
Ellie Newman – art direction
Brooke Hamilton – photography

References

Asleep at the Wheel EPs
2021 EPs